Joseph Dominic Ciochetto (born 22 October 1996) is a Guamanian-American soccer player who plays as a midfielder, winger, or attacker for Temecula FC and the Guam national team.

Career

Ciocchetto started his career with American fourth division side Temecula FC.

References

External links
 
 

Guam international footballers
Living people
American soccer players
1996 births
Association football wingers
Association football forwards
National Premier Soccer League players
Association football midfielders
Guamanian footballers